Sobibor extermination camp was a World War II German death camp.

Sobibor may also refer to:

Sobibór (village), Polish village near death camp
Sobibor (film), 2018 Russian film

See also
Sobibor trial, 1965–66 judicial trial of death camp personnel
Sobibór Museum, Polish museum at site of death camp
Sobibór Landscape Park, protected ecological area in Poland
Escape from Sobibor, 1987 British television film
Sobibor, October 14, 1943, 4 p.m., 2001 French documentary
List of victims of Sobibor
List of survivors of Sobibor